Star Dates is an American reality television program that aired on the E! network from 2002 to 2003.

Overview
The series consisted of ordinary people going on blind dates with B-list celebrities. Butch Patrick appeared on the first show. Other celebrities who appeared included Dustin Diamond, Kim Fields, Gary Coleman, Phillis Diller, Jill Whelan, and Jimmie Walker. Series host Jordan Black (and later Reggie Gaskins in season 2) also served as each couples chauffeur while they were on their date. Actress Robin Coleman appeared on the episode with Dustin Diamond as his date before she became well known.

References

External links
 

2000s American reality television series
2002 American television series debuts
2003 American television series endings
American dating and relationship reality television series